Parshuram Kund is a Hindu pilgrimage sites situated on the Brahmaputra plateau in the lower reaches of the Lohit River and 21 km north of Tezu in Lohit district of Arunachal Pradesh, India. Dedicated to sage Parshuram, the popular site attracts pilgrims from Nepal, from across India,including the nearby states of Manipur and Assam. Over 70,000 devotees and sadhus take a holy dip in its water each year on the occasion of Makar Sankranti, in the month of January.

Religious importance
It is a shrine of all-India importance located in the lower reaches of the Lohit River. Thousands of pilgrims visit the place in winter every year, especially on the Makar Sankranti day for a holy dip in the sacred kund which is believed to wash away one's sins. There is a mythological story behind this beautiful place as told by the local people. It is believed that Lord Parashuram the sixth incarnation of Lord Vishnu, on the orders of his father Rishi Jamadagni, beheaded his mother Renuka with his axe. Since he had committed one of the worst crimes of killing one's mother, the axe got stuck to his hand. His father pleased with his obedience decided to give him a boon to which he asked for his mother to be restored back to life. Even after his mother was brought back to life the axe could not be removed from his hand. This was a reminder of the heinous crime he had committed. He repented for his crime and on taking the advice of eminent rishis of that time, he arrived at the banks of Lohit River to wash his hands in its pure waters. It was a way to cleanse him of all the sins. As soon as he dipped his hands into the waters the axe immediately got detached and since then the site where he washed his hands became a place of worship and came to be known by sadhus as Parashuram Kund. 
Also there are many stories varying from region to region in India that describe the above incident and there are numerous temples dedicated to Lord Parashuram most of which are in Kerala. But this place attracts many pilgrims from near and far and quite a few sanyasis reside here and take care of the temple that is dedicated to Lord Parashuram.

History
The site of the Parashuram Kund as established by the sadhu was in existence until the 1950 Assam earthquake that shook the whole of the North-East and the kund was completely covered. A very strong current is now flowing over the original site of the kund but massive boulders have in a mysterious way embedded themselves in a circular formation in the river bed thus forming another kund in place of the old.

Tourism
Annual fair is held during Makara Sankranti, to which wild cows, rare fur-rugs and other curios are brought down by the hill tribes. There are also facilities for trekking from Tezu to glow lake which takes one day, hiking and river rafting and angling on the river Lohit.

Connectivity
The nearest railway station is Tinsukia (160 km) from where buses are available via Namsai. There are also buses available from Sadiya. The nearest airports are Tezu and Dibrugarh (Assam).

There is no railway available to Parshuram Kund as of now. A survey of 122 km Rupai-Parshuram Kund broad gauge railway line was complete at the initiative of Arunachal Chamber of Commerce and Industries, while a preliminary engineering-traffic survey for the Pasighat-Tezu-Parsuram Kund was conducted by northeast frontier railways at the request of the state government.

See also
Parasurameswara Temple - Called Gudimallam, an ancient temple from 2nd Century

References

External links
 
 

Cities and towns in Lohit district
Hindu pilgrimage sites in India
Hindu temples in Arunachal Pradesh